Coppola may refer to:
Coppola (surname), people with the surname Coppola
Coppola (cap), a traditional flat cap worn by men in Sicily

Characters
Coppola, a character from "Der Sandmann", a short story by E. T. A. Hoffmann
Ana Coppola, a character from Ichigo Mashimaro

Places
Villaggio Coppola, an Italian hamlet of Castel Volturno municipality

Companies
Coppola Industria Alimentare, an Italian food processing company
Coppola Foods, an Italian family owned food company

See also
Cupola (disambiguation)